These are the full results of the 2018 NACAC Championships in Toronto, Ontario, Canada, from August 10 to 12 at Varsity Stadium.

Men's results

100 meters

Preliminaries – August 11Wind:Heat 1: +0.4 m/s, Heat 2: +1.1 m/s

Heats – August 11Wind:Heat 1: +1.4 m/s, Heat 2: +1.5 m/s, Heat 3: +2.9 m/s

Final – August 11Wind: +0.4 m/s

200 meters

Heats – August 10Wind:Heat 1: +0.1 m/s, Heat 2: +0.5 m/s, Heat 3: +0.5 m/s

Final – August 12Wind:+1.7 m/s

400 meters

Heats – August 10

Final – August 11

800 meters
August 11

1500 meters
August 12

5000 meters
August 11

10,000 meters
August 10

110 meters hurdles

Heats – August 10Wind:Heat 1: +0.5 m/s, Heat 2: +0.8 m/s

Final – August 11Wind:+0.4 m/s

400 meters hurdles

Heats – August 10

Final – August 12

3000 meters steeplechase
August 12

4 × 100 meters relay
August 12

4 × 400 meters relay
August 12

20,000 meters walk
August 10

High jump
August 11

Pole vault
August 12

Long jump
August 12

Triple jump
August 10

Shot put
August 10

Discus throw
August 12

Hammer throw
August 11

Javelin throw
August 11

Women's results

100 meters

Heats – August 11Wind:Heat 1: +1.0 m/s, Heat 2: +0.8 m/s

Final – August 11Wind:+0.9  m/s

200 meters

Heats – August 10Wind:Heat 1: -0.2 m/s, Heat 2: +0.3 m/s

Final – August 12Wind:-0.3 m/s

400 meters

Heats – August 10

Final – August 11

800 meters
August 11

1500 meters
August 12

5000 meters
August 10

10,000 meters
August 11

100 meters hurdles

Heats – August 10Wind:Heat 1: +0.2 m/s, Heat 2: +0.5 m/s
    
Final – August 11Wind:+0.9 m/s

400 meters hurdles

Heats – August 10

Final – August 12

3000 meters steeplechase
August 10

4 × 100 meters relay
August 12

4 × 400 meters relay
August 12

20,000 meters walk
August 10

High jump
August 10

Pole vault
August 11

Long jump
August 11

Triple jump
August 12

Shot put
August 12

Discus throw
August 10

Hammer throw
August 10

Javelin throw
August 12

References

Events at the NACAC Championships in Athletics
NACAC Championships in Athletics - Results
2018 in Canadian sports